Michael Stanley (born 1948) is an American singer-songwriter, musician, and radio personality.

Michael or Mike Stanley may also refer to:

Michael Stanley (rugby union) (born 1989), Samoan rugby union rugby player

Mike Stanley, American baseball player
Mike Stanley (rower) (born 1957), New Zealand sports administrator and rower
Mike Stanley (filmmaker) (born 1963), American director, screenwriter, producer and editor

See also
Mickey Stanley (born 1942), baseball player